This is a list of string quartets by Wolfgang Amadeus Mozart.

 String Quartet No. 1 in G major, K. 80/73f
 String Quartet No. 2 in D major, K. 155/134a
 String Quartet No. 3 in G major, K. 156 (K. 134b)
 String Quartet No. 4 in C major, K. 157
 String Quartet No. 5 in F major, K. 158
 String Quartet No. 6 in B-flat major, K. 159
 String Quartet No. 7 in E-flat major, K. 160 (K. 159a)
 String Quartet No. 8 in F major, K. 168
 String Quartet No. 9 in A major, K. 169
 String Quartet No. 10 in C major, K. 170
 String Quartet No. 11 in E-flat major, K. 171
 String Quartet No. 12 in B-flat major, K. 172
 String Quartet No. 13 in D minor, K. 173
 String Quartet No. 14 in G major, K. 387
 String Quartet No. 15 in D minor, K. 421/417b
 String Quartet No. 16 in E-flat major, K. 428/421b
 String Quartet No. 17 in B-flat major, K. 458
 String Quartet No. 18 in A major, K. 464
 String Quartet No. 19 in C major, K. 465
 String Quartet No. 20 in D major, K. 499
 String Quartet No. 21 in D major, K. 575
 String Quartet No. 22 in B-flat major, K. 589
 String Quartet No. 23 in F major, K. 590

 
Mozart, Wolfgang Amadeus
String quartets